Nicole Arendt and Manon Bollegraf were the defending champions, but Bollegraf decided not to participate this year. Arendt partnered with Katrina Adams, but lost in the semifinals to Debbie Graham and Brenda Schultz-McCarthy.

Graham and Schultz-McCarthy went on to win the title, defeating Amy Frazier and Kimberly Po 6–1, 6–4 in the final.

Seeds

Draw

References
Main Draw

Challenge Bell
Tournoi de Québec
Can